Applegate may refer to:

Places 
 Applegate, California, United States
 Applegate, Michigan, United States
 Applegate, Oregon, United States
 Applegate Peak in Oregon
 The Applegate River in Oregon
 Applegate Lake, on the Applegate River
 Applegate Valley, along the Applegate River
 Applegate Valley AVA, an American Viticultural Area 
 Applegate Trail, a pioneer trail through the Oregon Territory
 Applegate language, a language in the Athabaskan group
 Applegate tribe, a Native American people

Other uses 
 Applegate (surname)

See also 
 
 
 Apple (disambiguation)
 Gate (disambiguation)